Richard "Richie" Doyle (born 28 July 1991) is an Irish hurler who currently plays as a substitute wing-back for the Kilkenny senior team.

Doyle made his first appearance for the team during the 2011 National League, however, he remained as a substitute for the subsequent championship. In his debut season he won an All-Ireland winner's medals and a Leinster winner's medal as a non-playing substitute.

At club level Doyle plays for the local Barrow Rangers club.

References

1991 births
Living people
Barrow Rangers hurlers
Kilkenny inter-county hurlers